Marcelo Melo and Bruno Soares were the defending champions but were knocked out by Santiago González and David Marrero in the semifinals. They eventually lost to Eric Butorac and Jean-Julien Rojer in the final 3–6, 4–6.

Seeds

Draw

Draw

External links
 Main draw

Doubles